Vina Vladimíra Olmera is a 1956 Czechoslovak film. The film starred Josef Kemr.

References

External links
 

1956 films
Czechoslovak drama films
1950s Czech-language films
Czech drama films
1950s Czech films
Czechoslovak black-and-white films
1956 drama films